Disciples is a 2014 American horror film featuring Tony Todd, Bill Moseley and Angus Scrimm.

Plot
Demons and humans band together to fight for the fate of humanity when an ancient prophecy unleashes an evil spirit, hell is brought upon the world.

Cast
Tom Lodewyck as The Priest - Asmodeus 
Tony Todd as Duncan - Belial
Linnea Quigley as Raine - The Seraph
Angus Scrimm as Winston - Azazel
Brinke Stevens as Tatiana - Agrat-Bat-Mahlat
Bill Moseley as Dread
Debbie Rochon as Elizabeth - The Watcher
Nick Principe as Friedrich - Astaroth
Camden Toy as The Watcher - Servant

References

External links
 
 

2014 films
American horror films
2010s English-language films
2014 horror films
2010s American films